Emin may refer to:

As a name
Emin (given name)
Emin (surname)

Places
 Emin County, county in Xinjiang, China
 Emin Minaret, the tallest minaret in China
 Emin Valley, on the borders of China and Kazakhstan
 Emin or Emil River, in Emin Valley

Other uses
 Emin (esoteric movement)
 Emin (Ottoman official), an Ottoman tax-collector, holder of an Eminet
 Emin Agalarov, Azerbaijani-Russian singer and businessman, known mononymously as "Emin"

See also
 Emin's gerbil
 Emin's pouched rat
 Emin's shrike